Acacia ridleyana is a shrub of the genus Acacia and the subgenus Plurinerves that is endemic to an area of western Australia.

Description
Like most species of Acacia it has phyllodes rather than true leaves. The leathery evergreen phyllodes have a narrowly oblong to linear-oblanceolate shape and are curved in a "S" shape or occasionally straight. It blooms from August to December and produces yellow flowers.

Distribution
It has a disjunct and scattered distribution through the Wheatbelt  and Mid West regions of Western Australia where it is found growing in clay, loamy or sandy soils. The range of the plant extends from the Murchison River in the north down to Northampton in the south with another population found further south near Mogumber Nature Reserve usually as a part of heathland communities.

See also
 List of Acacia species

References

ridleyana
Acacias of Western Australia
Taxa named by William Vincent Fitzgerald
Plants described in 1904